Nuria Llagostera Vives and María José Martínez Sánchez were the defending champions but Llagostera Vives chose not to participate this year. As a result, Martínez Sánchez partnered with Arantxa Parra Santonja but they lost 6–2, 6–1 in quarterfinals to Anabel Medina Garrigues and Yan Zi. Květa Peschke and Katarina Srebotnik won in the final against Bethanie Mattek-Sands and Meghann Shaughnessy, 7–5, 6–0.

Seeds

Draw

Main draw

External links
 Main Draw

Women's Doubles